Two Gentlemen is a 1997 EP by The Sea and Cake.

Track listing
 "The Cheech Wizard Meets Baby Ultraman In The Cool Blue Cave (Short Stories About Birds, Trees And The Sports Life Wherever You Are)" – 5:48
 "Rinky-Dink O.S. Type Rip" – 5:55
 "I Took the Opportunity to Antique My End Table" – 7:28
 "Early Chicago" – 4:38
 "The Sewing Machine" – 3:06

References

The Sea and Cake albums
1997 EPs
Thrill Jockey EPs